Francisco Z. Mena Municipality is a municipality in Puebla in south-eastern Mexico.

The municipality is named after General Francisco Zacarías Mena (1841-1910).

References

Municipalities of Puebla